The Michael J. Hindelang Award is an award, established in 1992, that is awarded annually by the American Society of Criminology to books published in the three previous years that are deemed to make "the most outstanding contribution to research in criminology." A book is only eligible to win the award if it is nominated by a member of the Society.

Recipients
2015     America’s Safest City: Delinquency and Modernity in Suburbia by Simon Singer
2014     Great American City by Robert J. Sampson
2013     The Black Child-Savers: Racial Democracy and Juvenile Justice by Geoff Ward
2012     Peculiar institution by David Garland
2011     American Homicide by Randolph Roth
2010     Governing Through Crime by Jonathan Simon
2009     Darfur and the Crime of Genocide by John L. Hagan and Wenona Rymond-Richmond
2008     Punishment and Inequality in America by Bruce Western
2007     Judging Juveniles by Aaron Kupchik
2006     Confessions of a Dying Thief by Darrell Steffensmeier and Jeffery Ulmer
2005     Companions in Crime by Mark Warr
2004     Shared Beginnings, Divergent Lives by John Laub & Robert Sampson
2003     Gangs and Delinquency in Developmental Perspective by Terence Thornberry, Marvin Krohn, Alan Lizotte, Carolyn Smith, and Kimberly Tobin
2002     Bad Kids by Barry Feld
2001     Making Good by Shadd Maruna
2000     Crime in Context by Ian Taylor
1999     Political Policing by Martha K. Huggins
1998     Mean Streets by Bill McCarthy and John Hagan
1997     Control Balance by Charles R. Tittle
1996     No award given
1995     Gender, Crime, and Punishment by Kathleen Daly
1994     Crime in the Making: Pathways and Turning Points Through Life by Robert J. Sampson and John H. Laub
1993     Point Blank: Guns and Violence in America by Gary Kleck
1992     Girls, Delinquency, and Juvenile Justice by Meda Chesney-Lind and Randall G. Shelden
1991     Crime, Shame, and Reintegration by John Braithwaite

References

Sociology awards
Awards established in 1991